Bembidion doris is a species of ground beetle native to Europe.

References

doris
Beetles described in 1796
Beetles of Europe